Detroit Arsenal was an American soccer team, founded in 1997. The club initially played under the USASA and won the National Championship title in 1999 and 2000, prior to joining the Midwest Conference of the National Premier Soccer League (NPSL), the fourth tier of the American soccer pyramid, in 2005.

The team's colors were black, silver and white.

The Arsenal were NPSL champions in 2005, their first year in the competition following the league's expansion into the Midwest.

Following the 2006 NPSL season, the team's management announced that they would spend the 2007 season on hiatus. The team never returned.

History
Detroit Arsenal joined the National Premier Soccer League (NPSL), considered the fourth tier of the American soccer pyramid and roughly equal to the USL Premier Development League (PDL), for the 2005 season alongside seven other clubs as part of the league's expansion into the American Midwest.

The Arsenal would have a very successful first season, going undefeated in the regular season with a record of 8 wins, 0 losses and 2 draws, with a league-leading 42 goals for and only 5 against. The club would advance to the play-off finals, defeating the Sonoma County Sol to win the NPSL Championship 1-0.

In their second season in 2006, the Arsenal finished in 2nd in the Midwest Conference with a record of 7-2-1. The club folded in the off season.

Year-by-year

Honors
 NPSL Champions 2005
 NPSL Midwest Division Champions 2005

References

National Premier Soccer League teams
A
Soccer clubs in Michigan
Sports in Oakland County, Michigan
Association football clubs established in 1997
1997 establishments in Michigan
2006 disestablishments in Michigan
Association football clubs disestablished in 2006
Berkley, Michigan